Parksville is a city on Vancouver Island in British Columbia, Canada. As of the 2021 Census, Parksville's population was 13,642, representing a 9.5% increase over the 2016 Census.

Parksville is well known for its large, sandy beaches at Parksville Bay and Craig Bay. The city's best-known annual event since 1982 is a sandcastle-building competition held from mid-July to mid-August, dubbed "Parksville Beachfest". Beachfest is the only World Championship Sand Sculpting official qualification event in Canada.

Parksville is served by the coast-spanning Island Highway, the Island Rail Corridor, and a nearby airport.

History
Human habitation has occurred in the area for thousands of years. Prior to Euro-Canadian settlement, the area was inhabited by several Coast Salish indigenous groups: Qualicum, Snaw-naw-as (Nanoose), and Snuneymuxw peoples.

The Spanish were the first Europeans to explore the area in 1791, followed shortly by the fleet of George Vancouver of the British Royal Navy. On Spanish maps, the Englishman River was called 'Rio de Grullas,' (River of Cranes, i.e. herons) at the site of modern-day San Pareil, while French Creek was named 'Punta de Leonardo.'

The first European landholder in the Parksville area was John Hirst, who pre-empted 120 hectares (300 acres) of land on both sides of the Englishman River in 1873, although he never relocated there from Nanaimo. The River, as it was known, remained an outpost until the turn of the 20th century when a road was built from Nanaimo.

A post office soon followed in 1877, with mail distributed from the cabin of the first postmaster, Nelson Parks, for whom the city is named.

At that time, logging was a major industry and the extension of the Esquimalt and Nanaimo (E & N) Railway in 1901, to McBride Junction spurred Parksville's growth and the beginning of a tourism boom, mainly Vancouver Islanders who travelled to Parksville to enjoy the incredible beaches.

Motels, stores, resorts and campgrounds soon followed and the community continues to prosper today. The Village of Parksville was incorporated June 19, 1945. Parksville became a town on April 1, 1978, and a city on June 1, 1981.

Geography
The majority of Parksville's land base lies between Englishman River and French Creek, although a substantial portion of the city lies east of Englishman River, along the western shores of Craig Bay.

Climate
Parksville has a Csb warm-summer mediterranean climate with July and August having less than 40mm of rain.

Demographics 

The median household income in 2006 for Parksville was $55,524, which is below the British Columbia provincial average of $62,346.

Ethnicity

Religion 
According to the 2021 census, religious groups in Parksville included:
Irreligion (6,900 persons or 51.9%)
Christianity (6,085 persons or 45.7%)
Buddhism (60 persons or 0.5%)
Judaism (35 persons or 0.3%)
Hinduism (25 persons or 0.2%)
Islam (10 persons or 0.1%)
Sikhism (10 persons or 0.1%)
Indigenous Spirituality (10 persons or 0.1%)

Economy 

Tertiary sector and secondary sector jobs make up the largest part of the Parksville economy. The three largest types of occupations in Parksville are the service industry; the construction industry; and the business, financial, and administration industries. These are the largest sectors of the city's economy largely due to the summer tourism industry, and a large influx of retirees moving into the area. There is also a fair amount of primary sector industry in the surrounding areas of Parksville, primarily fishing and forestry.

There is an industrial park located in the Southeast section of the city, known as the Orange Bridge Business District, which includes many tradesman shops.

Tourism
Parksville has long been a tourist location primarily catering to people from across Vancouver Island as well as Greater Vancouver.

Parksville Beach (located at Community Park) and Rathtrevor Beach are two of the city's main attractions.

Education
The City of Parksville is located within School District 69 Qualicum. Springwood Elementary, Oceanside Elementary and Ballenas Secondary School are all located within Parksville. School District 69 also operates a Continuing Education Centre, Collaborative Education Alternate Program and PASS/Woodwinds Alternate School in Parksville.

A regional campus of Vancouver Island University is located in Parksville.

Culture, recreation, and leisure

Polar Bear Splash 
Every year on January 1, residents gather at Parksville Community Park beach to plunge into the cold water to welcome in the new year.

Summer By the Sea Market 
Each summer, Parksville holds a night market on Tuesday's. The market draws in visitors and helps to support local small businesses. In the past, the market has had up to 150 vendors. During the COVID-19 pandemic, the market was relocated to the Parksville Community Centre and the number of vendors was reduced. As of 2022, it has returned to Craig Street.

Canada Day Parade 
Parksville hosts an annual Canada Day celebration. In the morning there is a parade that runs along the Island Hwy. Residents and visitors gather along the road to watch the procession and then walk down to Parksville Community Park where there are vendors, including food trucks, live music performances, some carnival attractions, and fireworks.

Notes

References

External links

 
Cities in British Columbia
Populated places on the British Columbia Coast
Regional District of Nanaimo